Wylie is a city and northeastern suburb of Dallas, that was once solely located in Collin County, but now extends into neighboring Dallas and Rockwall counties in the U.S. state of Texas.

History

Originally called Nickelville, reportedly after the name of the first store, it was organized in the early 1870s.  The Gulf, Colorado and Santa Fe Railway laid tracks a half mile north of the original townsite in 1886. The businesses of Nickelville moved to take advantage of the railroad within the following year, and the City of Wylie was incorporated in 1887 along the right-of-way. It was named for Lt. Colonel William D. Wylie, a right-of-way agent for the railroad and Civil War veteran.

That same year, Wylie had given itself its name, established a post office branch, and incorporated, choosing an alderman form of government. Two years later, the St. Louis Southwestern Railway reached the town. The two railroads and the rich agricultural region of the Blackland Prairies contributed to the town's growth. In 1890, Wylie had a population of 400 and the first one-room school house was built. By 1900, it had grown to 773. In the next decade, the population tripled. Before 1920, the community had over 35 businesses, including two banks, a school, and a weekly newspaper.

Unlike many rural Texas communities, Wylie grew during the Great Depression years, reaching 914 residents by 1940. In part, this was a result of increased dairy farming to meet the demands of nearby Dallas. Following World War II, the population increase continued.

Onions were the town's cash crop in the 1930s and 1940s. "Wide Awake Wylie" became the city's nickname in the late 1940s and 1950s, a result of late night get-togethers of its citizens and businesses that stayed open until midnight on some evenings.

In the 1990s, Wylie had two disasters. On May 9, 1993 (Mother's Day), a tornado ravaged downtown Wylie. In December 1998, two fires destroyed and damaged several businesses. After that, the downtown area was renovated, while preserving the many century-old buildings that remained standing. On April 11, 2016, a hail storm struck Wylie that produced softball-sized hailstones and damaged an estimated 80% of homes in the city, causing over $240 million in damage.

Geography
According to the United States Census Bureau, the city has a total area of 35.317 square miles, of which 21.037 square miles are land and 14.280 square miles, or 40.43%, are covered by water. Wylie is part of the subtropical region, with hot, dry summers and cold, mild, rainy winters.

Demographics

As of the 2020 United States census, there were 57,526 people, 15,730 households, and 12,863 families residing in the city. As of the 2010 census the population was 41,427, having grown 173.8% since the census of 2000, when 15,132 people, 5,085 households, and 4,108 families resided in the city. The population density was 781.2 people per square mile (301.6/km2). The 5,326 housing units averaged 275.0 per square mile (106.2/km2). The racial makeup of the city was 90.45% White, 2.07% African American, 0.70% Native American, 0.60% Asian, 0.03% Pacific Islander, 4.30% from other races, and 1.86% from two or more races. Hispanics or Latinos of any race were 10.44% of the population. At the 2020 census, the racial and ethnic makeup was 51.42% non-Hispanic white, 13.55% African American, 0.45% Native American, 0.07% Pacific Islander, 0.46% some other race, 4.58% multiracial, and 19.57% Hispanic or Latino of any race.

Of the 5,085 households in 2000, 50.7% had children under the age of 18 living with them, 64.9% were married couples living together, 11.2% had a female householder with no husband present, and 19.2% were not families. About 15.3% of all households were made up of individuals, and 4.2% had someone living alone who was 65 years of age or older. The average household size was 2.96 and the average family size was 3.29.

In the city, the population was distributed as 33.4% under the age of 18, 7.2% from 18 to 24, 37.6% from 25 to 44, 15.9% from 45 to 64, and 5.9% who were 65 years of age or older. The median age was 31 years. For every 100 females, there were 97.4 males. For every 100 females age 18 and over, there were 94.9 males.

In 2000, the median income for a household in the city was $58,393, and for a family was $62,903. Males had a median income of $44,239 versus $31,084 for females. The per capita income for the city was $22,987. About 2.4% of families and 3.4% of the population were below the poverty line, including 3.3% of those under age 18 and 3.4% of those age 65 or over.

Government
Wylie has a council-manager form of government, composed of a mayor and six council members (elected at large) along with an appointed city manager.  The city has operated under a city charter (home rule) since 1985, when voters approved the measure in a referendum.  
The city of Wylie is a voluntary member  of the North Central Texas Council of Governments association, the purpose of which is to coordinate individual and collective local governments and facilitate regional solutions, eliminate unnecessary duplication, and enable joint decisions.

Education
Most of the Collin County portion of Wylie is served by Wylie Independent School District. Small portions in Collin County are served by Community Independent School District, Plano Independent School District, and Princeton Independent School District. The Dallas County portion is served by Garland Independent School District. The Rockwall County portion is served by Rockwall Independent School District.

As of December 2019, Wylie has 11 elementary schools, 3 intermediate schools, 3 junior high schools, and 3 high schools, including Achieve Academy. Collin College opened its new Wylie campus in August 2020 that can service up to 7,500 students at full capacity.

Transportation
Wylie is served by these highways:

 State Highway 78
 Farm to Market 544
 Farm to Market 1378
 Farm to Market 2514
 Farm to Market 3412

Kansas City Southern provides freight rail services (its line roughly parallels State Highway 78) and operates an intermodal facility in the city.

Notable people

 Joe Eisma, comic artist for Image Comics, DC Comics and Archie Comics
 Kyle Fuller, center for the Houston Texans (Originally from Duncanville, Texas)
 Jackie Galloway, bronze medalist in taekwondo at the 2016 Summer Olympics in Rio De Janeiro, Brazil (Originally from Crown Point, Indiana)
 Chris Givens, NFL wide receiver
 Bill Harris, Major League Baseball pitcher – Cincinnati Reds, Pittsburgh Pirates, Boston Red Sox
 Braden Shewmake, MLB shortstop for the Atlanta Braves
 Victor Ulloa, defensive midfielder for Inter Miami (Originally from Ciudad Juárez, Chihuahua, Mexico)
 Nikita Whitlock, former NFL fullback

See also
A Killing in a Small Town, 1990 television movie
Candy, 2022 streaming TV miniseries
Love and Death, 2023 streaming TV miniseries

References

External links
 City of Wylie official website
 Wylie Chamber of Commerce
 Wylie Independent School District
 Wylie Campus – Collin College
 Wylie Economic Development Corporation
 Wylie News

WYLIE ISD Schools 
Elementary (K–4th)  Akin,Birmingham,Bush,Cox,Dodd,Groves,Hartman,Smith,Tibbals,Watkins,Whitt
Intermediate (5th–6th) Davis,Draper,Harrison 
Junior High  (7th–8th) McMillan,Cooper,Burnett
High School (9th–12th) Wylie High and Wylie East High
Disciplinary Academy (K–12th) Achieve Academy 
District Offices WISD Education Foundation INC 
Links for websites https://www.wylieisd.net/

Dallas–Fort Worth metroplex
Cities in Collin County, Texas
Cities in Dallas County, Texas
Cities in Rockwall County, Texas
Cities in Texas